John Eaton, Jr. (December 5, 1829 – February 9, 1906) was an American educator who served as the U.S. Commissioner of Education and a Union Army colonel during the American Civil War. On March 12, 1866, the United States Senate confirmed his January 13, 1866, nomination for appointment to the grade of brevet brigadier general of volunteers to rank from March 13, 1865.

Early life and education
Eaton was born in Sutton, New Hampshire, and attended Thetford Academy in Vermont. He was the eldest of nine children and his father was a farmer. He graduated from Dartmouth College in 1854, studied at Andover Theological Seminary, and was ordained in 1862 to the Presbyterian ministry. He had to teach all four years he was in college in order to pay his board and tuition. He received a Master of Arts and Legum Doctor from Rutgers University.

Career

Civil War
Eaton entered the American Civil War as a chaplain of the 27th Ohio Volunteer Infantry on August 15, 1861. In November 1862, after Lincoln's preliminary Emancipation Proclamation, Major General Ulysses S. Grant appointed him superintendent of freedmen and was later given supervision of all military posts from Cairo to Natchez and Fort Smith. In November 1863, Grant appointed him as the Superintendent of Negro Affairs for the Department of the Tennessee; there Eaton supervised the establishment of 74 schools. On October 10, 1863, Eaton was made colonel of the 63rd United States Colored Infantry. On January 13, 1866, President Andrew Johnson nominated Eaton for appointment to the grade of brevet brigadier general of volunteers, to rank from March 13, 1865, and the United States Senate confirmed the appointment on March 12, 1866.

Postbellum career
General Eaton left the military and eventually returned to his career in education. He remained with the freedman bureau until he was discharged on December 18, 1865 and then became editor of the Memphis Daily Post in 1866. From 1867-1869 he was the state superintendent of schools of Tennessee. He was then appointed United States Commissioner of Education in 1870 and served with efficiency in the United States Bureau of Education where he, among other things, organized Washington, D.C.'s Board of Education and reorganized the Bureau of Refugees, Freedmen, and Abandoned Lands.

From 1886 to 1891, Eaton was president of Marietta College, and, in 1895, he was appointed president of Sheldon Jackson College in Sitka, Alaska. In 1898, he became inspector of education in Puerto Rico and played a role in the centralization of its educational system. At the same time, he was the president of Westminster College in Salt Lake City. He also served as Councillor of the American Public Health Association, Vice President of the American Association for the Advancement of Science and president of the Association of Social Science. He was a representative of the Interior Department at the centennial exposition and the organizer of the educational exhibit at New Orleans. He was president of the national congress of education and of the American Society of Religious Education.

Eaton wrote a history of Thetford Academy, "Mormons of Today", "The Freedmen in the War", "Schools of Tennessee" and several reports, addresses and magazine articles.

Personal life 
After several years of failing health, he took ill on February 8, 1906, and died one day later in his apartment in the Concord Flats in Washington, D.C. He was buried in Arlington National Cemetery. Four years later, John Eaton Elementary School was named for him.

Eaton's daughter, Elsie Eaton Newton (1871–1941), was an educator associated with the United States Indian Service, and later served as the first Dean of Women at Marietta College.

See also

List of American Civil War brevet generals (Union)

References
 Eicher, John H., and Eicher, David J., Civil War High Commands, Stanford University Press, 2001, .

Notes

External links
President Rutherford B. Hayes on U.S. Commissioner of Education John Eaton: Original Letter Shapell Manuscript Foundation

1829 births
1906 deaths
Activists for African-American civil rights
American educators
American non-fiction writers
Editors of Tennessee newspapers
People from Sutton, New Hampshire
People of Vermont in the American Civil War
Andover Theological Seminary alumni
Rutgers University alumni
Dartmouth College alumni
Union Army colonels
United States Bureau of Education people
Writers from New Hampshire
Writers from Vermont
Thetford Academy, Vermont alumni
Burials at Arlington National Cemetery